Tuamāsaga is a district of Samoa, with a population (2016 Census) of 95,907. The geographic area of Tuamasaga covers the central part of Upolu island.

History & Politics

Malie & the Malietoa 
The paramount matai title of Tuamasaga is the Malietoa title.  Led by Auimatagi, Sa Malietoa and the nine senior orators of Malie are responsible for the election of the Malietoa title-holder at Niu'ula in Malie. Given that the district of Aiga-i-le-Tai (Manono and Apolima) and the district of Fa'asaleleaga on Savai'i are two key footholds of the Aiga Sa Malietoa (Malietoa clan), Malie often consults with Manono (capital  of Aiga-i-le-Tai) and Safotulafai (capital of Fa’asaleleaga) in the election of the Malietoa.

The village of Malie is the seat of the Malietoa.

At a national level, the Malietoa title is one of the four Tama-a-Aiga (noble families) titles. Apia, the nation's capital, is situated in the north of the district. The national parliament also sits at Mulinu’u to the west of Apia, and the main seaport is situated at Matautu to the north of Apia around the shores of Apia harbour.

Afega, Safata and the pāpā titles

The paramount pāpā titles of Tuamasaga are Gatoaitele and Vaetamasoalii. Afega is the seat of Gatoaitele. Once a decision is made, the village of Afega, through the chiefs Fata and Maulolo, must lead the bestowal process on behalf of the Fale Tuamasaga (the parliament of Tuamasaga). Safata is the seat of the Vaetamasoalii pāpā . These pāpā titles are usually bestowed upon the highest matai of Tuamasaga and one of the four Tama-a-Aiga (noble families) of Samoa.

Historically, the Fale Tuamasaga meets at Afega (malae  a  Vaitoelau) in times of war and at Malie (malae a filemu) in times of peace.

Tumua 
Together with the faleiva of Leulumoega and the faleono of Lufilufi, the lead orators of Malie & Afega (collectively called 'Tuisamau ma Auimatagi') comprise the group of tulafale alii (orator chiefs) who speak on behalf of Upolu on matters of state -  the Tumua.

Archaeology 
Archaeology in Samoa has uncovered earth mounds and archaeological remains at the village of Vailele in the sub-district of Vaimauga, on the central north coast to the east of Apia.

 
Districts of Samoa